Topstone is a census-designated place (CDP) in the town of Redding, Fairfield County, Connecticut, United States. It is on the west side of the town and is bordered to the west by the town of Ridgefield.

Topstone was first listed as a CDP prior to the 2020 census.

References 

Census-designated places in Fairfield County, Connecticut
Census-designated places in Connecticut